Sing a Song can refer to:

 Sing a Song (album), a 1978 album by Phyllis Hyman, and the title track
 "Sing a Song" (Earth, Wind & Fire song), a 1975 song by Earth, Wind & Fire
 "Sing a Song" (Third Day song), a 2003 song by Third Day
 "Sing a Song", a 2004 Japanese song from the album Chobits Character Song Collection
 "Sing" (Joe Raposo song), a 1972 song written for Sesame Street and popularized by the Carpenters, sometimes referred to as "Sing a Song"

See also
 "Sing a Song of Sixpence"
 "Sing a Simple Song"